TSV Schwieberdingen is a German association football club that plays in Schwieberdingen, Baden-Württemberg. The club was founded as a gymnastics club on 1 August 1906 with a strong labour union background and for the first forty years its primary interest remained in gymnastics. An attempt to form a football team in 1919 failed after a short time, but a second try in 1937 was successful.

History
The club was dissolved after World War II, like most organizations in Germany, including sports and football associations. It was re-established as Sport und Kulturverein Schwieberdingen in July 1946 and returned to its old name in late 1947. The club's focus in the two decades following the war was on gymnastics and football, with a growing emphasis on the latter. In the late 1960s and early 1970s TSV experienced considerable growth and added ten new departments, including table tennis, handball, volleyball, swimming and judo.

Through the late 1970s the club's football team advanced steadily from the A-Klasse Enz-Murr, to the 2. Amateurliga Württemberg, and then on to the Landesliga Württemberg (IV). Weak performances there saw the team demoted but it returned to fourth-tier play in the mid-1990s and advanced as far as the round of 16 in the 2002 Württemberg Cup. In 2004 Schwieberdingen earned a promotion to the Verbandsliga Württemberg (V) where it played until 2007, when a second-place finish and wins in the promotion play-off lifted the club into the Oberliga Baden-Württemberg, where they remained for a season before being relegated again. The club decided to withdraw its team to the tier-VIII Bezirksliga Enz-Murr after this. It dropped as far as the Kreisliga A for a season but returned to the Bezirksliga in 2014.

The club's youth division has also enjoyed a fair measure of success, winning the Württemberg championship twice, the South German championship twice, as well as earning third- and fourth-place finishes in the national youth finals.

Honours
 Verbandsliga Württemberg
 Runners-up: 2007
 Kreisliga A Enns/Murr 2 (IX)
 Champions: 2014

Recent seasons
The recent season-by-season performance of the club:

 With the introduction of the Regionalligas in 1994 and the 3. Liga in 2008 as the new third tier, below the 2. Bundesliga, all leagues below dropped one tier.

Stadium
TSV Schwieberdingen plays its home matches in the Felsenberg-Arena (capacity 5,000).

Notable players
 Prince Hadedeji Mayungbe

References

External links
Official team site
TSV Schwieberdingen profile at Weltfussball.de
Das deutsche Fußball-Archiv historical German domestic league tables 

Association football clubs established in 1937
Football clubs in Germany
Football clubs in Baden-Württemberg
Sports clubs established in 1906
1906 establishments in Germany